Hendrik Willem Tilanus (Deventer, 5 October 1884 – The Hague, 16 February 1966) was a Dutch politician and leader of the Christian Historical Union party from 1939 to 1962.

1884 births
1966 deaths
Christian Historical Union politicians
20th-century Dutch politicians
Leaders of the Christian Historical Union
Chairmen of the Christian Historical Union
Members of the House of Representatives (Netherlands)
People from Deventer